Burns Road (also spelled Burnes Road, and formally known as Muhammad Bin Qasim Road) is a street located in Karachi, Pakistan. It is well-known in the city for its many restaurants and street food vendors.

History 
Burns Road was named after the Scottish doctor and spy, James Burnes, who worked in British India in 19th century. After the foundation of Pakistan, the name of street was officially changed to Muhammad Bin Qasim Road, after Arab military commander Muhammad bin Qasim. The street has restaurants that were founded in the 1940s.

The street is considered a melting pot and is home to people of different ethnicities, including Punjabi Saudagaran-e-Delhi, Memons, Gaddis, and Qureshi Baradri.

Notable retailers
 Fresco Sweets
 Delhi Rabri House
 Waheed Kabab House

References 

Restaurants in Karachi
Streets in Karachi
Food markets
Karachi South District